Shrough Passage Tomb is a passage grave and National Monument located atop Slievenamuck, County Tipperary, Ireland.

Location

Shrough Passage Tomb is located atop Slievenamuck, near the source of the River Ara and halfway between Tipperary Town and Galbally, County Limerick. This is far from the main centres of passage grave construction.

History

Shrough passage tomb was built c. 3000 BC.

Description

Shrough Passage Tomb's entrance is formed with two orthostats on each side defining an area . The chamber is about 1.5 m x 1.2 m and is roofless. Many megalithic monuments are aligned towards mountains and celestial events; the entrance chamber at Shrough points roughly towards Slievenamon and the area of sunrise at equinox.

References

National Monuments in County Tipperary
Archaeological sites in County Tipperary